Jeanne Cheirel (1869–1934) was a French film and stage actress.  She was in the original cast of two of Georges Feydeau's plays Tied by the Leg (1894) and The Turkey (1896). She made her screen debut in a 1909 short film and continued acting in cinema until her death in 1934. She was the aunt of the actress Micheline Cheirel.

Selected filmography
 Germinal (1913)
 Flipotte (1920)
 Crainquebille (1922)
My Aunt from Honfleur (1931)
 Moonlight (1932)
 Let's Touch Wood (1933)
 The Weaker Sex (1933)
 The Concierge's Daughters (1934)
 The Secret of Polichinelle (1934)
 My Heart Is Calling You (1934)
 Miquette (1934)

References

Bibliography
 Goble, Alan. The Complete Index to Literary Sources in Film. Walter de Gruyter, 1999.
 Greco, Joseph. The File on Robert Siodmak in Hollywood, 1941-1951. Universal-Publishers, 1999.

External links

1869 births
1934 deaths
French film actresses
French stage actresses
Actresses from Paris
19th-century French women
20th-century French women